Reto Schäppi (born January 27, 1991) is a Swiss professional ice hockey center who currently plays for and is an alternate captain of the ZSC Lions of the National League (NL).

Playing career
He was named to the Switzerland men's national ice hockey team for competition at the 2014 IIHF World Championship and the following 2015 IIHF World Championship.

On January 13, 2014, Schäppi signed a two-year contract extension to remain with the ZSC Lions.

On April 29, 2016, Schäppi was signed to a two-year contract extension by the Lions.

On November 21, 2018, Schäppi signed an early two-year contract extension with the Lions.

On February 17, 2021, Schäppi agreed to an early one-year contract extension with the Lions through to the end of the 2021/22 season.

Career statistics

Regular season and playoffs

International

References

External links

1991 births
Living people
Swiss ice hockey centres
GCK Lions players
People from Horgen
Ice hockey players at the 2018 Winter Olympics
Olympic ice hockey players of Switzerland
ZSC Lions players
Sportspeople from the canton of Zürich